Win Blevins (born October 21, 1938) is an American author of fiction and non-fiction. He has written many books about the western mountain trappers, and is known for his "mastery of western lore." His notable works include Stone Song, So Wild a Dream, and Dictionary of the American West. According to WorldCat, the Dictionary of the American West is held in 728 libraries. Blevins has won numerous awards, including being named winner of the Owen Wister Award for Lifetime Achievement in writing literature of the West, being selected for the Western Writers Hall of Fame, being twice named 'Writer of the Year' by Wordcraft Circle of Native Writers, and winning two Spur Awards for Novel of the West.

Early life and education
Blevins, of Cherokee, Welsh-Irish, and African-American descent, is a native of Little Rock, Arkansas. After attending school in St. Louis, Missouri, he moved to New York, where he received a master's degree from Columbia University, graduating with honors, and continued to California, where he was graduated from the Music Conservatory of the University of Southern California.

Journalism and Writing Career
Win Blevins started his writing career as a music and drama reviewer for the Los Angeles Times. He then became the entertainment editor and principal theater and movie critic of the Hearst newspaper in Los Angeles, the Herald Examiner. His first book was published in 1973 and since then he has made a living as a free-lance writer. He has written articles for magazines, essays, published forty books, one a dictionary, several travel guides to the West, and the rest novels, including fantasy, historical fiction and modern works of the West such as his contemporaries Rudolfo Anaya, John Nichols, Scott Momaday, Max Evans and Barbara Kingsolver write. For fifteen years he was an editor at Macmillan Publishing. From 2010 - 2012, Win spent two years as Gaylord Family Visitor Professor of Professional Writing at the University of Oklahoma.

Screenplays
He has also written thirteen screenplays, including Atlas Shrugged for Al Ruddy; several for Paramount Pictures; The King of Paris with Dale Wasserman for CBS; The Real Dracula with Dale Wasserman (for Telly Savalas), CBS; Spring in Czechoslovakia for David Picker; John Milius's A-Team; Oonadaga for NBC; The Last Free Man for Fred Read, and six others. (In 1974 David Picker announced he would produce Ranch Life and the Hunting Trail directed by John Milius and written by Winfred Blevins, about Theodore Roosevelt.)

Books
Most of Win Blevins' books were originally published as hardbacks, and were subsequently made available as mass-market paperbacks, trade paperbacks, book club editions, foreign editions, audio books, and e-books. Almost all are still in print.
 Give Your Heart to the Hawks, Nash Publishing, 1973. Narrative non-fiction.
 Charbonneau: Man of Two Dreams, Nash Publishing, 1975. Historical fiction.
 The Misadventures of Silk and Shakespeare, Jameson Books, 1985. Historical fiction.
 The Yellowstone, Bantam, 1988 (Rivers West series), Bantam Books. Historical fiction.
 Roadside History of Yellowstone Park, 1989, Mountain Press Publishing Company. Guide Book.
 Powder River, Bantam, 1990 (Rivers West series). Historical fiction.
 The Snake River, Bantam, 1992 (Rivers West series). Historical fiction.
 The High Missouri, Bantam, 1994 (River West series). Historical fiction.
 Dictionary of the American West, 1993, Facts on File.
 History from the Highways: Wyoming, with Thomas Schmidt, 1993, Pruett Press. Guide Book.
 Stone Song: A Novel of the Life of Crazy Horse, TOR-Forge Books, 1995. Historical fiction. According to WorldCat, the book is held in 774 libraries
 The Rock Child, TOR-Forge Books, 1998. Historical fiction.
 RavenShadow, TOR-Forge Books, 1999. Historical fantasy.
 Dictionary of the American West, expanded edition, Sasquatch Books, 2001. Expanded to include the Pacific Northwest, especially Alaska.
 Moonlight Water, written by Win Blevins and Meredith Blevins, TOR-Forge Books, 2015.
 The Darkness Rolling, written by Win Blevins and Meredith Blevins, TOR-Forge Books, 2015.
 Stealing Fire, written by Win Blevins and Meredith Blevins, TOR-Forge Books, 2016
 Going Home, written by Win Blevins and Meredith Blevins, WordWorx Publishing, 2017
 Jedediah Smith: The Story of a Wayfaring Heart, Wordworx Publishing, 2020
 Learning to Soar: Memoir of a Spiritual Awakening, Wordworx Publishing, 2020

The Rendezvous Series
 So Wild a Dream, TOR-Forge Books, 2003. Historical fiction. According to WorldCat, the book is held in 1094 libraries, his most widely held book.
 Beauty for Ashes, TOR-Forge Books, 2004. Historical fiction.
 Dancing with the Golden Bear, TOR-Forge, 2005. Historical fiction.
 Heaven Is a Long Way Off, TOR-Forge Books, 2006. Historical fiction.
 A Long and Winding Road, TOR-Forge Books, 2007. Historical fiction.
 Dreams Beneath Your Feet, TOR-Forge Books, 2008. Historical fiction.

Natural History
 Buffalo, Rio Nuevo, 2005 (Looks West series). Natural history.

Cherokee Pre-History Fantasy
 Zadayi Red, TOR-Forge Books, 2009, published under the pen name Caleb Fox. Historical fantasy.  Reissued as 'The Promised One' by Meredith & Win Blevins 
 Shadows in the Cave, TOR-Forge Books, 2010, TOR-Forge Books, published under the pen name Caleb Fox. Historical fantasy. Reissued with authors Meredith & Win Blevins

Yazzie Goldman Thrillers
 Stealing Fire, TOR-Forge, 2016
 The Darkness Rolling, TOR-Forge, 2015

As General Editor
Blevins also created, edited, and co-published the series Classics of the Fur Trade.
 The River of the West: The Adventures of Joe Meek, volume one—The Mountain Years, by Frances Fuller Victor, Mountain Press Publishing Company, 1983. Autobiography.
 Journal of a Mountain Man, by James Clyman, Mountain Press Publishing Company, 1984. Journal.
 The River of the West: The Adventures of Joe Meek, volume two—The Oregon Years, by Frances Fuller Victor, Mountain Press Publishing Company, 1985. Autobiography.
 Edward Warren, by Sir William Drummond Stewart, Mountain Press Publishing Company, 1986. Fiction.
 The Personal Narrative of James O. Pattie, by James Ohio Pattie, Mountain Press Publishing Company, 1988. Memoir.
 The Long Rifle, by Steward Edward White, Mountain Press Publishing Company, 1990. Historical fiction.

Awards
 Owen Wister Award, 2015, for lifetime achievement in writing literature of the West.
 Selection to the Western Writers Hall of Fame, displayed in the Buffalo Bill Museum, Cody,Wyoming, 2015.
 So Wild a Dream- Spur award, 2004.
 Stone Song –Spur Award, Mountains and Plains Booksellers award for best fiction of 1995.
 Dictionary of the American West – Wordcraft Circle of Native Writers and Storytellers (Writer of the Year) 2002.
 Heaven Is a Long Way Off - Wordcraft Circle of Native Writers and Storytellers (Writer of the Year) 2006-2007.

Pseudonyms
Win has published two novels and an article in True West Magazine under the pen name, Caleb Fox.

References

1938 births
Living people
American male novelists
20th-century American novelists
21st-century American novelists
Native American writers
20th-century American male writers
21st-century American male writers